The 2018 NCAA Division II women's basketball tournament involved 64 teams playing in a single-elimination tournament to determine the NCAA Division II women's college basketball national champion. It began on March 9, 2018, and concluded with the championship game on March 23, 2018.

The first three rounds were hosted by top-seeded teams in regional play. The eight regional winners met for the quarterfinal and semifinals, better known as the "Elite Eight" and "Final Four" respectively, and National Championship game at the Sanford Pentagon in Sioux Falls, South Dakota.

The Central Missouri Jennies defeated the Ashland Eagles, 66–52, to win the championship and end Ashland's 73-game winning streak.

Bracket

Atlantic Regional
 Site: Richmond, Virginia (Virginia Union)

Central Regional
 Site: Sioux Falls, South Dakota (Augustana (SD))

East Regional
 Site: Easton, Massachusetts (Stonehill)

Midwest Regional
 Site: Ashland, Ohio (Ashland)

South Regional
 Site: Jackson, Tennessee (Union (TN))

Southeast Regional
 Site: Jefferson City, Tennessee (Carson-Newman)

South Central Regional
 Site: Lubbock, Texas (Lubbock Christian)

West Regional
 Site: Azusa, California (Azusa Pacific)

Finals
Quarterfinals, semifinals and finals were hosted at the Sanford Pentagon in Sioux Falls, South Dakota.

See also
 2018 NCAA Division I women's basketball tournament
 2018 NCAA Division III women's basketball tournament
 2018 NAIA Division I women's basketball tournament
 2018 NAIA Division II women's basketball tournament
 2018 NCAA Division II men's basketball tournament

References

NCAA Division II women's basketball tournament
NCAA tournament
2018 in sports in South Dakota
Sports in Sioux Falls, South Dakota